Gonionotophis is a genus of snakes, known commonly as African ground snakes and file snakes, in the family Lamprophiidae. The genus is endemic to Central Africa.

Species
There are three recognized species in the genus:

Gonionotophis brussauxi  – Brussaux's file snake, Mocquard's African ground snake
Gonionotophis grantii  – Grant's African ground snake, Grant's file snake, savanna lesser file snake
Gonionotophis klingi  – Kling's file snake, Matschie's African ground snake

Nota bene: A binomial authority in parentheses indicates that the species was originally described in a genus other than Gonionotophis.

Etymology
The specific name, brussauxi, is in honour of French anthropologist Eugène Brussaux.

The specific name, grantii, is in honor of British physician Robert Edmond Grant.

References

Further reading
Boulenger GA (1893). Catalogue of the Snakes in the British Museum (Natural History). Volume I., Containing the Families ... Colubridæ Aglyphæ, part. London: Trustees of the British Museum (Natural History). (Taylor and Francis, printers). xiii + 448 pp. + Plates I-XXVIII. (Gonionotophis, new genus, p. 323).
Branch, Bill (2004). Field Guide to Snakes and other Reptiles of Southern Africa. Sanibel Island, Florida: Ralph Curtis Books. 399 pp. . (Genus Mehelya, p. 78).

Lamprophiidae
Snake genera
Taxa named by George Albert Boulenger